A URI Template is a way to specify a URI that includes parameters that must be substituted before the URI is resolved. It was standardized by RFC 6570 in March 2012. 

The syntax is usually to enclose the parameter in Braces ({example}). The convention is for a parameter to not be Percent encoded unless it follows a Question Mark (?).

Examples
 http://example.com/people/{firstName}-{lastName}/SSN
 http://example.com/query{?firstName,lastName}

If we were building these URIs for Björk with firstName=Björk and lastName=Guðmundsdóttir they would be:
 http://example.com/people/Björk-Guðmundsdóttir/SSN
 http://example.com/query?firstName=Bj%c3%b6rk&lastName=Gu%c3%b0mundsd%c3%b3ttir

See also
 European Legislation Identifier (URI template is used by ELI)

External links
 RFC6570 - URI Template at the IETF
 List of RFC6570 Implementations

Internet Standards
URL